Smith v. Spisak, 558 U.S. 139 (2010), was a United States Supreme Court decision on the applicability of the Antiterrorism and Effective Death Penalty Act of 1996. It further examined issues of previous court decisions on jury instructions and the effectiveness of counsel.

Background
Frank Spisak Jr. (June 6, 1951 – February 17, 2011) was an American serial killer who was convicted of three murders and one attempted murder at Cleveland State University. In 1982, he decided that he wanted to be like Hitler. In February 1982, Spisak embarked on a racist, anti-Semitic shooting spree, calling it his first "seek and destroy mission" in which he was attempting to "clean up the city". On February 1, 1982, Spisak shot Reverend Horace Rickerson, a 57-year-old black man, seven times. On June 4, 1982, he shot John Hardaway, another black man, seven times. On August 9, 1982, Spisak shot at Coletta Dartt, a white woman who he claimed had "made some derisive remarks about us," referring to the Nazi Party. Spisak missed and Dartt managed to escape. On August 27, 1982, he shot Timothy Sheehan, a white man who he thought was Jewish, four times. On August 30, he shot Brian Warford, a 17-year-old black youth, once in the head. Spisak was found guilty of three counts of aggravated murder and sentenced to death. During his murder trial, he grew a Hitler mustache and carried a copy of Mein Kampf.

Spisak had an accomplice, Ronald Reddish, who aided him before the shootings. Reddish was convicted of one count of attempted murder and sentenced to 7 to 25 years in prison. He was paroled in 1990.

His claims were denied by the State of Ohio in direct appeal and to the Ohio Supreme Court stating that his claim was "not well-taken on the basis of our review of the record".

Spisak filed for habeas corpus relief in the District Court for the Northern District of Ohio. First he argued that the jury instructions at the penalty phase of trial unconstitutionally required the jury to consider in mitigation only factors that the jury unanimously found mitigating (violating Mills v. Maryland, 1988). Second he argued that he had suffered significant harm because his original counsel had given an inadequate closing argument during sentencing (violating Strickland v. Washington, 1984). The District Court subsequently denied his petition.

The petition was accepted on appeal to the Sixth Circuit which blocked the State from executing Spisak. The State of Ohio appealed to the Supreme Court. In Hudson v. Spisak (552 U.S. 945, 2007) the Court remanded the case back to the Sixth Circuit and ordered the appeals court to reconsider in light of two recent cases, Schriro v. Landrigan (2007) and Carey v. Musladin (2006). The Sixth Court of Appeals again reinstated its earlier opinion. Again the State appealed and the Supreme Court granted review.

Decision of the Court
The unanimous decision was handed down by Justice Breyer. The court asked two questions; Did the Sixth Circuit disobey the directives of the Antiterrorism and Effective Death Penalty Act (AEDPA) and Did the Sixth Circuit exceed its authority when it presumed that Mr. Spisak suffered harm by deficient counsel? It answered yes to both.

First Question
In Mills v. Maryland (1988), the Supreme Court ruled that when imposing the death penalty the jury must be allowed to consider any mitigating circumstances that included any part of the defendant's record. In addition the jury must be allowed to consider "any relevant mitigating evidence."

Under the AEDPA a federal court is allowed to override a state court if the state court decision was directly contrary to established Federal Law. The Court ruled that the State of Ohio had not violated the rights of the defendant by requiring the jury to only consider unanimous mitigating factors.

In addition the Court overruled the Appeals Court determination that the instructions were unconstitutional on the basis that the jury was precluded from considering other sentencing options until it had rejected the death penalty. The Court criticized the Appeals Court saying "we have not previously held jury instructions unconstitutional for this reason, Mills says nothing about this matter."

Second Question
In Strickland v. Washington (1984), the court ruled that in order for an individual to claim relief for deficient counsel the petitioner must demonstrate that the "counsel's representation fell below an objective standard of reasonableness." In addition there must be evidence that because of this deficient counsel the result would have been different.

The Court found that the counsel had done an adequate job. The court went further and stated that even if counsel had not sufficiently defended Spisak there was no reasonable probability that the outcome would have been different. Describing in detail the closing arguments of the trial Justice Stevens went as far to say that Spisak had "alienated and ostracized the jury".

Subsequent developments
On February 17, 2011, Spisak was executed via lethal injection at the Southern Ohio Correctional Facility near Lucasville, Ohio, at the age of 59. He was the longest serving death row inmate in the state of Ohio.

Spisak's last meal consisted of spaghetti with tomato sauce, a salad, chocolate cake, and coffee.

See also
 Capital punishment in Ohio
 Capital punishment in the United States
 List of people executed in Ohio
 List of people executed in the United States in 2011
 List of serial killers in the United States
 List of white defendants executed for killing a black victim
 Race and capital punishment in the United States

References

External links
 

2010 in United States case law
United States Sixth Amendment case law
United States Sixth Amendment ineffective assistance of counsel case law
United States Supreme Court cases
United States Supreme Court cases of the Roberts Court